Robert Nicholas "Rob" Cimetta (born February 15, 1970) is a Canadian former professional ice hockey left winger.  He played in the National Hockey League with the Boston Bruins and Toronto Maple Leafs between 1988 and 1992. He later spent several years in the Deutsche Eishockey Liga, retiring in 2000.

Biography
Cimetta was born in Toronto, Ontario. As a youth, he played in the 1983 Quebec International Pee-Wee Hockey Tournament with the Toronto Young Nationals minor ice hockey team. He was drafted in the first round, 18th overall, by the Boston Bruins in the 1988 NHL Entry Draft.  He played 103 games in the National Hockey League: 54 with the Bruins and 49 with the Toronto Maple Leafs.

Cimetta was in the South Tower of the World Trade Center during the September 11, 2001 attacks.  He was on the 61st floor in the Morgan Stanley office, and managed to exit the tower before its collapse.

Career statistics

Regular season and playoffs

International

References

External links
 

1970 births
Living people
Canadian people of Italian descent
Adler Mannheim players
Berlin Capitals players
Boston Bruins draft picks
Boston Bruins players
Canadian expatriate ice hockey players in Germany
Canadian ice hockey left wingers
Indianapolis Ice players
Maine Mariners players
National Hockey League first-round draft picks
Newmarket Saints players
St. John's Maple Leafs players
Ice hockey people from Toronto
Survivors of the September 11 attacks
Toronto Maple Leafs players
Toronto Marlboros players